Veto is the power to stop an action

Veto may also refer to:

Places
United States
Veto, Alabama
Veto, Mississippi
Veto, Ohio
Veto, West Virginia

People
Gabor Veto (born 1988), Hungarian boxer
Vető, Hungarian surname

Music
Veto (band), a Danish rock band
Veto (album), a 2013 extreme metal album by Heaven Shall Burn